The 2013 King's Cup is a football tournament that took place from 20 July to 10 August 2013. The tournament was held in Thimphu, Bhutan at the Changlimithang Stadium.

Venue

Group stage
The nine participants were divided into two groups. The top two teams for each group qualified for the semifinals. Brothers Union from Bangladesh was set to participate at the tournament and was included in Group A but was replaced by Arambagh Krira Sangha, also from Bangladesh.

Group A

Group B

Knock-out stage

Semifinals

Final

Awards

Top scorers

Team statistics
This table will show the ranking of teams throughout the tournament.

External links
King's Cup 2013 Official Facebook Page

References

King's Cup (Bhutan)
King's Cup
Bhutan